The name Paula has been used for two tropical cyclones worldwide.

Atlantic Ocean: 

 Hurricane Paula (2010) - a small hurricane that struck Honduras and Cuba, causing minimal damage. 

Australian Region: 

 Cyclone Paula (2001) - caused extensive damage to areas of Vanuatu. 

Atlantic hurricane set index articles
Australian region cyclone set index articles